Reagan is an unincorporated community in McMinn County, Tennessee, United States.

Notes

Unincorporated communities in McMinn County, Tennessee
Unincorporated communities in Tennessee